The 1986 South African Open (also known as Altech Open for sponsorship reasons) was a tennis tournament played on outdoor hard courts in Johannesburg, [South Africa that was part of the 1986 Nabisco Grand Prix. It was the 83rd edition of the tournament and was held from 17 through 23 November 1986. Amos Mansdorf won the singles title.

Finals

Singles
 Amos Mansdorf defeated  Matt Anger 6–3, 3–6, 6–2, 7–5

Doubles
 Mike De Palmer /  Christo van Rensburg defeated  Andrés Gómez /  Sherwood Stewart 3–6, 6–2, 7–6

References

External links
 ATP Tournament Profile
 ITF – Johannesburg Tournament Details

South African Open
South African Open (tennis)
Open
Sports competitions in Johannesburg
1980s in Johannesburg
November 1986 sports events in Africa